The 1955–56 Football League season was Birmingham City Football Club's 53rd in the Football League and their 29th in the First Division, having been promoted as Second Division champions in 1954–55. They finished in a club-record sixth position in the 22-team division. They entered the 1955–56 FA Cup in the third round proper and reached the Final for only the second time, despite being drawn to play away from home in each round, the first time this had occurred. They lost 3–1 to Manchester City in a match remembered for City's goalkeeper Bert Trautmann playing the last 25 minutes with a broken neck.

Birmingham City became the first English club side to take part in European competition when they played their first group game in the 1955–58 Inter-Cities Fairs Cup on 16 May 1956, a goalless draw away at Inter Milan. The competition lasted over three English seasons with the final not played until 1958. Invitations to enter the Fairs Cup, a tournament set up to promote industrial trade fairs, were extended to the city hosting the trade fair rather than to clubs. Some cities entered a select team including players from more than one club, but Aston Villa, the other major club based in the city of Birmingham, rejected the opportunity to field a combined team.

Twenty-four players made at least one appearance in nationally or internationally organised first-team competition, and there were thirteen different goalscorers. Goalkeeper Gil Merrick and forwards Eddy Brown and Peter Murphy played in 46 of the 50 first-team matches over the season, and Brown finished as leading goalscorer with 29 goals in all competitions, of which 21 were scored in the league.

Football League First Division

Note that not all teams completed their playing season on the same day. Birmingham were in fourth position after their last game of the season, on 21 April, but by the time the last game was played, on 2 May, they were sixth, having been overtaken by Manchester City and Arsenal.

League table (part)

FA Cup

Inter-Cities Fairs Cup

Appearances and goals

Players with name struck through and marked  left the club during the playing season.

See also
Birmingham City F.C. seasons

References
General
 
 
 Source for match dates and results: 
 Source for lineups, appearances, goalscorers and attendances: Matthews (2010), Complete Record, pp. 346–47, 473.
 Source for kit: "Birmingham City". Historical Football Kits. Retrieved 22 May 2018.

Specific

Birmingham City F.C. seasons
Birmingham City